Mohammed Ali Shehki is a Persian-Pakistani pop singer. Shehki entered the music scene in the 1970s with his originally composed and written songs, with a touch of Persian music. He later earned a name for himself in Pakistani pop music and as a playback singer.

Early life
Though Shehki is Persian by origin but has been living in Pakistan as a Pakistani national for most of his life. His family name 'Shehki' comes from his Iranian father who used to work at the Iranian Consulate in Karachi. His father married a half-Iranian half-Pashtun woman living in Karachi at the time.

He studied engineering at the NED University of Engineering and Technology, Karachi, Pakistan and graduated from there in 1981. Later, he made a career in aviation. Due to his originality, Shehki is the first ever pop singer receiving national awards for consecutive years by Pakistan Television Corporation (PTV), film and other national and international awards and recognitions.

Playback singing
Shehki's passion for music took him to the forefront of the Pakistani show business. Sohail Rana, a well-known Pakistani film and television music composer, conducted an audition for PTV, Karachi television station in 1973. Many boys and girls including Shehki participated in that audition. In fact, Shehki was Sohail Rana’s first choice because he had gained the top position in that audition.

Career
Shehki's debut song was ‘Sambhal, sambhal kar chalna hai.’ Music composer was Sohail Rana, the song was live telecast as an introduction by Karachi television station's program, 'Naghma Zaar'. Then a first full song "Mere pyaar ke tu sung sung" by TV music composer Niaz Ahmed and producer Ghazanfar Ali. Blessed with a good strong voice, trained in basics of music by his ustad Habib Ahmed Khan, and then Sohail Rana, Shehki soon gained public recognition. He lent his voice to Sehba Akhtar’s national song (quomi naghma), ‘Mein bhee Pakistan hoon, tu bhee Pakistan hai.’ a big hit of the time and 'Aye Watan Tere Betay Hain' by music composer, Sohail Rana.

After doing a five years stint as a main feature in PTV Program "Jharney", produced by Shoaib Mansoor, he ended up as a highly popular artist, with many hits like "Meri Ankhon se iss dunya ko dekho, phir jo chaho tau chali jana", "Tumse bicharker", "Nazaray" and several other hit songs. He teamed up with Sultana Siddiqui doing a regular quarterly PTV show Dhanak as a singer and presenter.  Then with Sahira Kazimi in PTV show Rang Tarang again for a long span of time. From that show, he piled up his hit songs like "Mere Bachpan Ke Din, Kitnay Achay thay Din" and "Ye Pehli Pehli Barish".

He appeared with famous folk singer Allan Fakir to record this folk song, ‘Teray ishq mein jo doob gaya, Allah, Allah kar bhaiyya". "Ham Raat Bohat Roi" written by the poet Ibn-e-Insha again earned him the national award as the best singer. Due to his origin and fluency in Persian language, he did all Persian poetry programs on PTV of Allama Iqbal with its true essence. His numerous film songs are still remembered fondly, especially songs composed by Indian composer Babul Bose for film "Raaz". In Pakistani TV film Shorr with actress Babra Sharif, written and directed by Ghazanfar Ali, Shehki, besides playing the lead, also did the music score and film songs.

Film career
In his film career, he acted in a total of 9 films, his films achieved some success at the box office but the industry was already on the decline, so he left films. His films are Dekh Tamasha (Piyar do ya maardo), Choron ka Badshah (1988 film) celebrated platinum jubilee, Son of Andata (1987), Zor Awar, Sonia, Guide, Wachan, TV film Shorr.

References

External links
Mohammad Ali Shehki on YouTube

Pakistani playback singers
Living people
1957 births
Pakistani pop singers
Muhajir people
Pakistani people of Iranian descent
Pakistani television people
People from Karachi